Vicki Berlin Tarp (born Vicki Jensen on 16 November 1977 in Helsingør) is a Danish actress, best known for her roles in Anja og Viktor – i medgang og modgang (2008) and Triangle of Sadness (2022).

References

External links 
 

Danish actresses
Living people
1977 births
People from Helsingør